Achhroo Ram Kapila (25 August 1926 – 15 October 2003), usually known as A.R. Kapila or Achhroo Kapila, was one of Kenya's pre-eminent criminal trial lawyers, representing a number of African leaders.

Born in Ludhiana, Punjab, India, his family moved to Kenya in 1930 and he remained there for the rest of his life.

Kapila was called to the Bar at Lincoln's Inn in London in 1946, and rose to fame in
October 1952 when he was one of the lawyers who unsuccessfully defended the Kapenguria Six, a group
of Kenyan political figures accused of Mau Mau links (Jomo Kenyatta, Bildad Kaggia,
Kung’u Karumba, Fred Kubai, Paul Ngei and Achieng Oneko). Kapila worked with the
British barrister, D.N. Pritt, and a team of Kenyan and other African and Indian lawyers
including Fitz De Souza. Subsequently, he represented other African leaders, including
Julius Nyerere of Tanzania and Albert René of Seychelles.

Following independence Kapila spoke out against the increasing corruption of Kenyan politics
and, in particular, its judiciary. His stand made him several enemies, and resulted in his
imprisonment for a short period for illegal possession of foreign currency after police found
£26 in his home after a trip to Britain.

External links 
http://www.thetimes.co.uk/tto/opinion/obituaries/article2077616.ece (paywall)

20th-century Kenyan lawyers
1926 births
2003 deaths
Kenyan Hindus
Indian emigrants to Kenya
Kenyan people of Punjabi descent